Sara Wood (b. 1941 in England) was a popular British writer of 49 romance novels in Mills & Boon from 1986 to 2004.

Biography
Sara Wood was born on 1941 in the south of England. Her family was poor but aspirational and avid readers. At the age of 11 Sara won a scholarship for a free place at a well-known fee-paying school. Although she passed all of her O level exams at the age of 16, she left school to train as a secretary and to help the family finances.

Married at 21, with her two sons Richard and Simon being born in the following 3 years, she fitted in care of her young children by starting up a play group and then providing bed and breakfast for tourists in her seaside home. The marriage eventually ended in divorce and Sara needed to find an occupation that would be suitable for her schoolboy sons. She trained as a teacher and met her present husband at the educational college. When they married they moved to Sussex.

Charlotte Lamb inspired her to try writing a Mills & Boon book and it was accepted. Sara decided to write full-time. After some years, she and her husband moved to Cornwall but they have now returned to Sussex and live in the same town as Richard and Simon – and their families. Sara now has 5 grandchildren.

Now, Sara Wood and her husband are grandparents and they live in Sussex.

Bibliography

Single Novels
Perfumes of Arabia (1986)
Passion's Daughter (1986)
Pure Temptation (1987)
Wicked Invader (1987)
The Count's Vendetta (1988)
Savage Hunger (1988)
No Gentle Loving (1988)
Tender Persuasion (1988)
Love Not Dishonour (1989)
Master of Cashel (1989)
Threat of Possession (1989)
Desert Hostage (1990)
Nights of Destiny (1990)
Sicilian Vengeance (1990)
Cloak of Darkness (1991)
Dark Forces (1992)
The Vengeful Groom (1994)
Love or Something Else (1995)
The Seduction Trap (1997)
Temporary Parents (1998)
A Husband's Vendetta (1999)
The Innocent Mistress (1999)
A Spanish Revenge (2000)

Destiny Trilogy
Tangled Destinies (1994)
Unchained Destinies (1994)
Threads of Destiny (1994)

True Colours Trilogy
White Lies (1996)
Scarlet Lady (1996)
Amber's Wedding (1996)

Euromance Multi-Author Series
Mask of Deception (1993)

Postcards from Europe Multi-Author Series
Mask of Deception (1993)

Too Hot to Handle Multi-Author Series
Southern Passions (1993)

Dangerous Liaisons Multi-Author Series
Shades of Sin (1993)

Island Dreams Multi-Author Series
The Dark Edge of Love (1994)

Mediterranean Passions Multi-Author Series
In the Heat of Passion (1994)

Wedlocked! Multi-Author Series
Second-Best Bride (1995)
Husband by Arrangement (2003)

Family Secrets Multi-Author Series
A Forbidden Seduction (1995)

Expecting! Multi-Author Series
Expectant Mistress (1998)
For the Babies' Sakes (2002)

Society Weddings Multi-Author Series
The Impatient Groom (1999)

His Baby Multi-Author Series
Morgan's Secret Son (2001)

Greek Tycoons Multi-Author Series
The Kyriakis Baby (2001)
The Greek Millionaire's Marriage (2004)

Mistress to a Millionaire Multi-Author Series
The Unexpected Mistress (2001)
In the Billionaire's Bed (2003)

Italian Husbands Multi-Author Series
The Italian's Demand (2002)

Brides of Convenience Multi-Author Series
A Convenient Wife (2003)

Red-Hot Revenge Multi-Author Series
A Passionate Revenge (2004)

Blackmail Brides Multi-Author Series
The Italian Count's Command (2004)

Anthologies in Collaboration
Her Greek Millionaire (2005) (with Helen Bianchin and Helen Brooks)
Billionaire Grooms (2006) (with Emma Darcy and Leigh Michaels)
Twins Come Too! (2006) (with Jessica Hart and Marion Lennox)
Escape to Italian Idylls (2006) (with Diana Hamilton)
The Sweetest Revenge (2007) (with Anne Mather and Susan Stephens)
Sinful Secrets (2007) (with Catherine George and Miranda Lee)
Paper Marriages (2008) (with Jacqueline Baird and Sara Craven)
In the Greek's Bed (2008) (with Margaret Barker and Kim Lawrence)
At Her Latin Lover's Command (2009) (with Fiona Hood-Stewart and Susan Stephens)

See also
List of women writers
Annalee Blysse
Laurelin Paige

References and Resources

External links
Sara Wood's Webpage in Fantastic Fiction's Website

English romantic fiction writers
1941 births
Living people
English women novelists
Women romantic fiction writers